Tyrrelstown GAA (Irish: CLG Bhaile an Tirialaigh) is one of six Gaelic Athletic Association (GAA) clubs based in Dublin 15 and the youngest founded in 2008 [1](the others are Castleknock, Erin Go Bragh, Garda, St Brigid's, St Peregrines and Westmanstown Gaels). The club was officially launched in the GAA's 125th anniversary year, 2009 [3]. They field teams at juvenile level in football, hurling, and camogie from Under 8 through to Under 16. Their colours are navy, green and white.

Football

The Tyrrelstown GAA Social team played in the Dublin 15 Cross Community Integration Group Cup in 2009 against St. Peregrines GAA winning 3-4 to 2-6 winning the club's first trophy.[2] The club started competing for the first time at junior level in 2010 entering a team in the Junior E Championship and Division 11 North.[4] Their Junior football team reached their first Junior football championship final in 2011 losing to Geraldine P. Morans.

The junior football team played their home games in St. Catherines Park for the 2012 season. They co-organised a football tournament with St. Peregrines in August 2012. Also participating along with Tyrrelstown and St. Peregrines were fellow Dublin 15 club Erin Go Bragh and Croi Ro Naofa from Killinarden. Croi Ro Naofa beat Tyrrelstown in the cup final while St. Peregrines defeated Erin Go Bragh in the shield final.

Honours

 Dublin 15 Cross Community Integration Group Cup: 2009 Winners [2]
 Dublin Junior E Football Championship: 2011 Runners Up

References

External links
Official Club Website
Dublin Club GAA
Dublin GAA
 Dublin 15 Cross Community Integration Group Cup
 Gazette club launch GAA anniversary year
 Hill 16 - fixtures and results

Gaelic games clubs in Fingal
Gaelic football clubs in Fingal